Souvenirs  is a studio album by the progressive bluegrass band Country Gentlemen released in 1995.

Track listing
 Mountains and Memories  (Bucke) 03:26
 Mother of a Miner's Child  (Lightfoot) 02:31
 Where the Moss Grows over the Stone  (Craft, Louvin) 03:08
 Wild Rose  (Cordle, Jackson) 04:00
 Faded Love  (Wills, Wills, Wills, Wills) 03:00
 Drifting Away  (Jackson) 02:16
 One More Hill  (Hylton) 02:16
 Souvenirs  (Grappelli, Prine, Reinhardt) 02:25
 Lady With the Flower in Her Hair  (McPeak) 04:19
 Noah's Ride  (Corbett) 02:53
 Too Many Cooks in the Kitchen  (Holmes) 02:21
 Hunker Down  (Spaulding) 02:34

Personnel
 Charlie Waller - guitar, vocals
 Jimmy Bowen - mandolin, vocals
 Ronnie Davis - bass
 Greg Corbett - banjo

with
 Kim Gardner - Dobro
 Tim Smith - violin

References

1995 albums
Rebel Records albums
The Country Gentlemen albums